The canton of Tonnerrois is an administrative division of the Yonne department, central France. It was created at the French canton reorganisation which came into effect in March 2015. Its seat is in Tonnerre.

It consists of the following communes:
 
Aisy-sur-Armançon
Ancy-le-Franc
Ancy-le-Libre
Argentenay
Argenteuil-sur-Armançon
Arthonnay
Baon
Bernouil
Chassignelles
Cheney
Collan
Cruzy-le-Châtel
Cry
Dannemoine
Dyé
Épineuil
Flogny-la-Chapelle
Fulvy
Gigny
Gland
Jully
Junay
Lézinnes
Mélisey
Molosmes
Nuits
Pacy-sur-Armançon
Perrigny-sur-Armançon
Pimelles
Quincerot
Ravières
Roffey
Rugny
Saint-Martin-sur-Armançon
Sambourg
Sennevoy-le-Bas
Sennevoy-le-Haut
Serrigny
Stigny
Tanlay
Thorey
Tissey
Tonnerre
Trichey
Tronchoy
Vézannes
Vézinnes
Villiers-les-Hauts
Villon
Vireaux
Viviers
Yrouerre

References

Cantons of Yonne